Pilgrim Township is a township in Dade County, in the U.S. state of Missouri.

History
Pilgrim Township was named after the settlement of Pilgrim, Missouri, which is still listed by the USGS as an unincorporated community. A post office called Pilgrim was established in 1886, and remained in operation until 1907. A first settler of the community was a native of Kentucky; its name may be a transfer from Pilgrim, Kentucky.

References

Townships in Missouri
Townships in Dade County, Missouri